Hammersmith and Fulham was a constituency represented in the House of Commons of the Parliament of the United Kingdom.   It elected one Member of Parliament (MP) by the first past the post system of election. The constituency was abolished at the 2010 general election with its wards being split between two new constituencies of Chelsea and Fulham & Hammersmith.

Boundaries 

The constituency was created in 1997 from parts of the former seats of Hammersmith & Fulham. It covered the central and southern portions of the London Borough of Hammersmith and Fulham, including the town centres of both Hammersmith and Fulham, but also included smaller districts such as West Kensington, Brook Green, Barons Court, and Sands End.

The constituency was made up of the electoral wards of:

Addison; Avonmore; Broadway; Brook Green; Colehill; Crabtree; Eel Brook; Gibbs Green; Grove; Margravine; Normand; Palace; Ravenscourt; Sands End; Sherbrooke; Sulivan; Town; Walham.

Boundary review
Following their review of parliamentary representation in North London, the Boundary Commission for England's boundary changes which took effect at the 2010 general election erased the Hammersmith and Fulham constituency.

Two new constituencies of Chelsea and Fulham & Hammersmith took Hammersmith and Fulham's electoral wards. The Chelsea and Fulham seat is a cross-border creation.

History 
This highly marginal constituency was represented by only two MPs during its 13-year existence. Iain Coleman won the seat for the Labour Party on its creation in 1997. He narrowly held the seat in 2001, but did not seek a third term as its MP in 2005 due to ill health. On that occasion Greg Hands gained the seat for the Conservative Party, and held it until its abolition in 2010 when he was elected for the new seat of Chelsea and Fulham.

Members of Parliament

Elections

Elections in the 2000s

Elections in the 1990s

References

See also 
 List of parliamentary constituencies in London

Politics of the London Borough of Hammersmith and Fulham
Constituencies of the Parliament of the United Kingdom established in 1997
Constituencies of the Parliament of the United Kingdom disestablished in 2010
Parliamentary constituencies in London (historic)
Hammersmith
Fulham